Skyman is a 2019 American science fiction-found footage horror film written and directed by Daniel Myrick. Inspired by memories from his childhood and interest in supernatural events, Myrick wrote the premise to be a "character study" comparable to the real-world psychological trauma and life-long experiences of alien abductees.

In interviews leading up to the film's release Myrick stated, "This isn't Dan trying to do another found footage horror film. This is its own thing." The film was met with an overall mixed critical reception, while praise was directed at the actors, and realistic portrayal of letting go of the past.

Premise 

The story of Carl Merryweather, a man who is famous in his local town as someone who believes he experienced an alien encounter at 10-years-old, is explored. Now thirty years later, he is convinced that the extraterrestrials will reconnect with him on his 40th birthday. Merryweather, who is obsessive with making contact with UFOs, attempts to do so at the same location of his previous interaction. His skeptical sister Gina agrees to go with him for support, while bringing a film crew to document the event.

Cast 
 Michael Selle as Carl Merryweather
 Jack Sandler as young Carl Merryweather
 Nicolette Sweeney as Gina Merryweather
 Faleolo Alailima as Marcus Florio
 Michele Yeager as Vanessa, the news anchorwoman
 Paul Wilson as Timothy, the news anchorman
 Willow Hale as Mrs. Cummings
 Lee Broda as Nurse Mary
 Dominic Medina as sound guy
 Avery Guerrera as abductee

Production

Development 
Based on his interest and fascination in science fiction-based activity from his childhood, Myrick wrote the script as a character-study story after researching the topic of the film. Myrick studied real-world self-proclaimed alien abductees Barney and Betty Hill, as well as read books detailing abduction by extraterrestrials including Messengers and Communion. Developed and marketed as the first new film directed by Myrick in years, and drawing attention to his co-directorship on The Blair Witch Project (1999), the low-budget project garnered some significant media attention. A joint-venture production between Daniel Myrick Films, Red Arrow Studios, and Hungry Bull Productions; Gravitas Ventures purchased distribution rights of the indie faux-documentary following its debut at the 2019 Austin Film Festival.

Casting 
Unknown actors were cast in the roles, in an effort for perceived realism, with Emily Schweber serving as Casting Director.

Filming 
The project was filmed in as a documentary film-styled found footage film. This filming style was chosen after consideration over traditional photography, by the filmmaker, as he felt like it gave him and the actors creative freedom with improvisational flexibility. The intent by creatives involved was to keep the budget small, while Myrick stated "I really think it was the best way to tell this story in and of itself, and I hope people embrace that about it."

Dan Myrick served as co-cinematographer, alongside Kevin Burke.

Release
The film premiered at the 2019 Austin Film Festival, after which distribution rights were purchased by Gravitas Ventures. The film released as a drive-in theater exclusive on June 30, 2020. Myrick expressed his excitement in doing so, stating "You're literally under the stars. It doesn't get any better than that...It's just a great movie to see under the stars and that's the big thing for me. You get to look right up at the very constellations that Carl is contemplating." Skyman had a direct-to-video VOD release on July 7, 2020.

Reception
On Rotten Tomatoes the film has an approval rating of  based on reviews from  critics. The film was met with a mixed reception, with critiques targeting the pacing, as well as the "exhausted" sub-genre in horror, stating that it doesn't reach "the spooky heights to which it aspires"; while praising the realistic and "touching" story of an "all-too-real examination of the way a single childhood incident can infect an entire life".

References

External links
 
 

2019 films
2019 horror films
2019 science fiction films
2010s science fiction horror films
Alien abduction films
Films directed by Daniel Myrick
Found footage films
Films with screenplays by Daniel Myrick
Films produced by Daniel Myrick
2010s English-language films